is a Japanese  manga magazine published by Hakusensha on the 25th of January, April, July, and October.

The magazine serves as a supplementary issue to the larger magazine Hana to Yume, featuring one-shots or side stories of series running in Hana to Yume. There are series running irregularly in the magazine.

Serializations

Current
 Life So Happy (transferred from Hana to Yume in 2018)
 W Juliet II

Past
 Duel Love: Koi Suru Otome wa Shōri no Megami
 Full House Kiss
 Gakkō Hotel
 Hakuji
 Jiujiu (transferred from Hana to Yume in 2010)
 Love So Life (transferred to Hana to Yume in 2009)
 Pheromomania Syndrome (transferred from Hana to Yume in 2007)
 S.A (transferred to Hana to Yume in 2004)
 Sarashi Asobi
 Toraware Gokko
 Yūjō Survival

References

External links
 Official website 

1999 establishments in Japan
Bi-monthly manga magazines published in Japan
Hakusensha magazines
Magazines established in 1999
Shōjo manga magazines